Bart August Maria Peeters (born 30 November 1959) is a Belgian singer, musician, television presenter and actor.

Biography

Early years
Peeters studied Germanic philology and drama in Antwerp. There, he met Jan Leyers and Hugo Matthysen, with whom he worked later. 

In 1972, Peeters, still a teenager, played the title role in teen drama Bart Banninks. He went on to present some comedy and music shows aimed at teenagers. In 1978, Bart Peeters, Hugo Matthysen, Jan Leyers and Marc Kruithof played in a coverband called Beri Beri, but as a musician Bart Peeters gained his fame with The Radios. This band (with Ronny Mosuse, Robert Mosuse, Dany Lademacher, Alain Van Zeveren and Marc Bonne) had an international hit with 'She Goes Nana' in 1991.

Television career
After gaining fame his television career took off, starting out with a main role in the now legendary series Dag Sinterklaas in which he visited Sinterklaas (played by Jan Decleir) in his castle. After that he presented some of the most popular television shows in Flanders, such as De Droomfabriek and De Leukste Eeuw. Het Peulengaleis, a television spin-off from Het Leugenpaleis, a radio comedy show he presented together with Hugo Matthysen, gained a large cult following. He became the most popular television personality in Flanders, being selected to present large one-off shows such as the celebration show for 50 years of television in Flanders or the tsunami relief telethon and presenting some television shows in The Netherlands.

Music was always present in his television career: he presented the Flemish selection show for the Eurovision Song Contest several times, had his own talent show (De Grote Prijs Bart Peeters) and presented several music shows (Lalala Live, Nonkel Pop,...). During this time he was also the drummer for The Clement Peerens Explosition, a parody rock band that started in his radio show Het Leugenpaleis.

Solo career
After touring as Bart Peeters zonder circus (Bart Peeters without circus) and making a solo album based on the tour called Het Plaatje van Bart Peeters (The Record of Bart Peeters) in 2004, he decided to spend more time on music again, starting a proper solo career. In 2006 he made Slimmer dan de Zanger (More Clever Than the Singer) and in 2008 he released his third album, De Hemel in het Klad (Draft of Heaven), which went straight to number one in the Flemish charts. A fourth album titled De Ideale Man (The Ideal Man), said to be the third of a trilogy together with Slimmer dan de Zanger and De Hemel in het Klad, was released in October 2010. That same year, he won a Music Industry Award in Flanders for best Dutch-language artist, after which he released a compilation album called Het Beste en Tot Nog Eens (All the best and see you later) and took a break from recording music. In 2014 he made his comeback with Op de Groei (To Grow Into).

Personal life
Bart Peeters is married and has two daughters and a son. He lives in Hove near Antwerp.

Discography

 Het Plaatje van Bart Peeters (2004)
 Slimmer dan de Zanger (2006)
 De Hemel in het Klad (2008)
Het kinderplaatje van Bart Peeters (2008)
 De Ideale Man (2010)
 Het beste en tot nog eens (2011)
 Op de Groei (2014)
Live 2015-2016 (2016)
 Brood voor morgenvroeg (2017)
Bart Peeters & Pop Up Koor o.l.v. Hans Primusz (2019)
Bart Peeters Deluxe - Live in de Lotto Arena (2020)

Television programs
 Bart Banninks (1976), teen drama
Magister Maesius (1973), teen drama
 Elektron (1982–1984), science show
 Pop-Elektron (1982–1984), music show
 De Droomfabriek (1989–1995), dream-fulfilling-show
 Dag Sinterklaas (1993–1994), children's series
 De Vliegende Doos (1995), variety show
 De Liegende Doos (1995), late night version of De Vliegende Doos
 Kinderen voor Kinderen festival (1989-1992), children's series
 Lalala Live (1996–1999), music show
 NV Peeters (1997), game show
 Nonkel Pop (1998), music show
 TopPop Yeah (on AVRO)
 De Droomshow (1997-1999), (on AVRO)
 De Grote Prijs Bart Peeters (1999–2000), talent contest
 De Leukste Eeuw (1999–2003), compilation show about television history
 Het Peugenpaleis (1999–2004), absurd comedy show
 De Nationale Test (2001)
 Eurosong (1999, 2002, 2004, 2006, 2008, 2014)
 Hoe?Zo! (2002–2009), game show about science on both Flemish and Dutch television
 50 jaar televisie (2003), one-off celebration for 50 years of Television in Flanders
 Hij komt, hij komt ... De intrede van de Sint (2003–present), annual arrival of Sinterklaas broadcast live
 Geen Zorgen tot Paniek (2004), variety show
 Tsunami 12-12 (2005), one-off tsunami simulcast telethon
 Media Morgen: de grote zap voorwaarts (2006), one-off show about the future of television
 De show van het jaar (2006), New Year's show
 De bedenkers (2007–2008), invention talent contest
 Zeker Weten! (on Teleac/NOT) (2008-2009), quiz show
 K2 zoekt K3 (2009), talent show for a new member for pop group K3
 Mag ik u kussen? (2009–2011), celebrity comedy version of Blind Date
 De Generatieshow (2010), game show
 De Slimste Thuis (2011), family game show
 Een Laatste Groet (2012), comedy guest show
 De Neus van Pinokkio (2013), comedy celebrity game show
Bart & Siska (2015)

References

External links
Official website (Dutch)

1959 births
Living people
Belgian male singers
Belgian pop singers
Belgian male guitarists
Belgian drummers
Belgian comedy musicians
Belgian male comedians
Belgian humorists
Dutch-language singers of Belgium
Belgian radio presenters
Flemish television presenters
Belgian children's television presenters
Belgian game show hosts
20th-century Flemish male actors
University of Antwerp alumni
Flemish male television actors
People from Mortsel
Nationaal Songfestival presenters